Green Snake, known in China as White Snake 2: The Tribulation of the Green Snake, is a 2021 Chinese computer animation fantasy film directed by Amp Wong, with animation production by Light Chaser Animation, Alibaba Pictures, Tianjin Maoyan Weiying Culture Media and Bilibili. It is the sequel to 2019's White Snake. The film was inspired by the Chinese folktale Legend of the White Snake and was released in China on 23 July 2021.

Synopsis
Verta the green snake-demon must find a way to escape from the modern Shura City of mortals, in order to rescue her elder sister Blanca the White Snake from the demon-slaying monk Fahai without her demonic abilities.

Plot
At Zhenjiang, China, the snake-demon sisters, Blanca the white snake and Verta the green snake, challenge the demon-slaying monk, Fahai, to rescue Blanca's husband, Xu Xian. They are defeated, Blanca's hairpin wand gets destroyed and she gets imprisoned under Leifeng Pagoda. Verta blames Xian for being weak and useless, as well as Blanca for falling for him. Verta gets overpowered again and gets sucked into a portal.

Verta wakes up, without her demonic powers, in a modern dystopian city called Asuraville, a place that imprisons creatures from many different eras. She meets a woman named Sun, who helps her adjust to the modern world, and a mysterious masked man with amnesia, who saves them. The main enemies in Asuraville are an army of Ox-Heads & Horse-Faces, led by the Ox Leader who seeks to conquer the city. Sun is killed by the Ox's army, but Verta is saved by the Raksha army, led by a man named Simon, whom Verta gets smitten with.

Simon takes her to All-Good Market to meet the owner, who turns out to be the fox-demon. Verta also meets the masked man again. The fox-demon explains that everyone gets sent here because they have an obsession. The only way to leave is to let it go by discarding their token and jumping into the Pool of Release, but it makes you forget what you cared about and drains your will. Not wanting to forget Blanca, Verta doesn't do it, while the masked man can't remember his obsession. She lets him join them in gratitude for saving her.

Back at Raksha territory, the Ox's army kills Simon's army. While outrunning some evil spirits, the masked man gets stuck and Verta tries to help him, but Simon abandons them upon seeing them as dead weight. The pair survive anyway. Verta learns a lesson that in love strength doesn’t matter, having a good heart does, accepting that her sister was right. The masked man removes his mask, revealing his face resembles Blanca, indicating that he's a reincarnation of her from another era. They go back to the market, with Simon there too, to ask the fox-demon for an alternate way of getting out. She tells them about the Wish Bridge, which is harder, but doesn't cost anything. The Ox's army invades the market. Simon apologizes to Verta and gets killed. Then, the masked man's Blanca face is revealed to be a fake, given by the Ox to use him as a spy. Verta then decides to stop relying on others and focus on getting stronger herself. Despite Verta’s anger, the masked man proves he's still on her side.

On a bus to the Wish Bridge, Verta must first survive the Black Wind Tunnel to make it crossable. In the tunnel, she battles Fahai for 20 years (1 day in Asuraville) until she kills him and destroys the Pagoda, thus ensuring Blanca's freedom in the human world. The pair race to the bridge against the Ox, who gets bitten and turned into an evil spirit. When they almost don't make it, the masked man lets himself become an evil spirit so he can fly Verta to the exit, sacrificing himself. All she takes with her is his bone flute.

Back in the human world, 1,000 years have past and Verta still can't find Blanca. She sees the Pagoda has been rebuilt and its treasures have been put in an exhibition. She finds the pieces of Blanca's hairpin with one missing. She puts them together and adds the bone flute to it, restoring it. Verta realizes the masked man was a reincarnation of Blanca after all and she was his obsession. As she cries, a female voice says her name. Verta happily sees its Blanca.

In the Mid-credits scene, the fox-demon meets with the river monster under the same bridge, where he gives her a cut off fox tail. Her enemy is near and she plots her revenge.

Cast 
 Tang Xiaoxi (Mandarin), Vivian Lu (English), Ayane Sakura (Japanese) as Verta (  "Little Green")
 Wai Wai as the Masked Man
 Wei Chao (Mandarin), Jason Jin (English) as Sima (Simon)
 Zhao Mingzhou as Niutou Sect leader
 Xiaopu Zheng (Mandarin), Faye Mata (English), Aoi Yūki (Japanese) as Baoqing Fox
 Song Xuchen as Fahai
 Qiu Qiu as Sister Sun
 Zhang Biyu as the Spider Goblin
 Zhang Zhe (Mandarin), Stephanie Sheh (English), Suzuko Mimori (Japanese) as Blanca (  "Little White")
 Yang Tianxiang as Xu Xian
 Lin Qiang as the Scholar
 Baomu Zhongyang as the Muscle Man

Release
Green Snake was released throughout China on 23 July 2021. As of 1 December 2021, it's available on Netflix in the U.S.

Reception
Green Snake earned a total of 200 million yuan ($30.86 million) in its first three days of release.

Roger Moore gave the movie 1.5 out of 4 stars, saying, "Green Snake is like the cover of a Robert W. Howard Conan book rendered in CGI anime animation — violent and lurid, with lots of action and a little skin. The story? Well, let’s just say it’s more impressive to look at than to try and follow and absorb."

Accolades

References

External links

2021 films
2021 computer-animated films
2020s Mandarin-language films
Chinese animated fantasy films
Chinese computer-animated films
Films based on the Legend of the White Snake
Films set in Zhejiang
2021 fantasy films